EGCR may refer to:
 Croydon Airport (IATA code: EGCR), a former airport in South London, England
 Ashcroft Airfield (IATA code: EGCR), an airport in Winsford, England
 Experimental Gas Cooled Reactor, a nuclear reactor constructed but never operated by the Oak Ridge National Laboratory, Tennessee, U.S.